"Cry for You", released as "Cry for You (You'll Never See Me Again)" on Hard2Beat, is a song by Swedish singer Petra Marklund, performing as September, from her second studio album In Orbit (2005). It was released in Sweden on 29 November 2006 as the third and final single from the album. The single version was also included on her third studio album Dancing Shoes (2007) as a bonus track, and it was released as a single from her various compilation albums that were released in Europe. Musically, "Cry for You" is a dance-pop and euro-pop track, with it lyrically being about getting out of an relationship. 

Commercially, "Cry for You" was considered September's biggest hit to date, along with her single "Satellites", peaking in the top ten in twelve countries, including Sweden, Ireland, and the United Kingdom, while also charting in nine different countries. In the United States, the song spent three weeks at the top spot of Billboard's Hot Dance Airplay Chart in May 2007, and became September's first and only entry so far on the Billboard Hot 100, peaking at 74 in 2008. "Cry for You" was certified Gold by the RIAA in November 2010 for sales of over 500,000 copies, making September the first Swedish artist to receive a Gold certification in the United States since Ace of Base achieved it for their song "Cruel Summer" in 1999. In late 2018, the song regained popularity after the song was turned into a meme on Twitter, using its "you'll never see me again" lyrics, nearly 12 years after its release.

Composition and release
Before the worldwide release in 2007, September had originally recorded the song for her studio album In Orbit (2005). However, in many compilations September has released, the song has appeared on her compilations including September, Dancing in Orbit, Gold and Cry for You - The Album. 
According to September, she explained the reason why she wanted to release it worldwide, by saying "The song was so strong by itself. And I've been there and it feels like the fans are starved of dance music. But now dance music is coming back again, and the world is getting smaller and smaller because of the internet – that now sometimes you don't even have to do much promotion, although obviously it is still very important. But I think that a hit song will always find a way."

In an interview with Digital Spy, they asked about the background of the song, when she replied:

The song features a dance-pop, Europop and house sound and has been compared to Bronski Beat's "Smalltown Boy" and its sampled counterpart, "Tell Me Why" by Supermode, although possible similarities have been declared unintended.

Critical reception
"Cry for You" received positive reviews from music critics. Nick Levine from Digital Spy awarded the song with four stars out of five, giving it a positive review. He stated "[...] it's a surprisingly affecting Eurodance number, a record that's both relentlessly danceable and desperately sad" and said its "actually a pretty decent record." However, he felt the song was not "original" enough to outbet releases by fellow Swedish singer Robyn. Popjustice said the song is a "massive balls-out club anthem and we think it works rather well." Ben Norman from About.com called the song the "Best Dance Crossover Track", while saying "Robbins [Entertainment] has since made peace with me by backing and promoting Swedish singer September and this Europop confection. Good job guys!."

AllMusic had rated the song three-and-a-half-stars out of five stars. K. Ross Hoffman, also from AllMusic, had highlighted the song as an album standout, and said "'Cry [for You]' is the obvious standout, managing to conjure both sophistication and a surprising degree of emotion from its fairly pedestrian frothy electro-pop arrangement and polished but powerful vocal turn." However, he also added "'Cry for You' is a strong enough track (though fairly faceless too, in its way) [...]." PopBytes.com gave it a positive review, saying it's "total pop dance fluff but highly enjoyable."

Chart performance
On the issue date of 30 August 2008 the song debuted at number ninety-four on the U.S. Billboard Hot 100 after spending 8 weeks on the Bubbling Under chart. The next week it moved to number ninety-two. In its third week it moved eight places to number eighty-four. The song made its highest peak on the Hot 100 at number seventy-four, and on the Pop 100 at number twenty-nine. It spent a total of 10 weeks on the U.S. Billboard Hot 100.  "Cry for You" also made it onto other popular countdowns in the U.S. after its re-release in 2008; entering at number thirty-nine on American Top 40, and number twenty on the TRL Weekend Countdown radio show.

In the UK and Ireland, "Cry for You" was released in April 2008 on the Hard2Beat Records label, a subsidiary of Ministry of Sound, in a new remix with a new video. The remixed version entered the UK Singles Chart at number nine, and later climbed to number five, following release of a physical single for the song. On 28 December 2008, the UK Singles Chart had this as number thirty-five for the top songs of 2008.

In France, "Cry for You" topped the airplay chart and debuted at number six on the singles chart. The song debuted in Switzerland at number thirteen, next week it moved at number seven on downloads alone. It debuted at number sixteen in Germany and peaked at number eleven. In the Netherlands the song was a huge success too, peaking at number four and staying in the top forty for twenty-one weeks. In Europe the song peaked at number fifteen on the European Hot 100 Singles.

In Australia, the original single version was released to radio, rather than the shorter UK remix (although the UK remix has been played several times on Australian radio). The song debuted at number nineteen on 10 August 2008 and peaked at number fourteen. In New Zealand airplay and official charts, the song debuted at number thirty-nine on the issue date of 22 September 2008.

"Cry for You" was certified gold for shipment of over 500,000 copies by the Recording Industry Association of America in 2010. The song is the first by a Swedish artist to be certified by the RIAA since Ace of Base's Cruel Summer in 1998. The song was listed at number five on the Top 100 Club Chart Year-End result.

Music video
Two music videos were released for the single. The international version is set at the edge of a futuristic city inside a large solitary building which could be a prison, barracks or factory. Inside are hundreds of clones dressed in black latex catsuits who are marching in unison, watched over by women wearing white. They at first appear to be marching towards a screen which shows September singing and dancing while wearing a strapless dress. The video intercuts between September and one of the clones singing the song, while another clone dances atop a podium. On the bridge, one of the clones breaks ranks. As she runs away, she takes off her black sunglasses and hood of her catsuit to reveal she is September. She is pursued by the women guards dressed in white who fire their laser guns, but September reaches a door and escapes outside.

The original video was a promotional video featuring September in a photoshoot, as it features on several covers of the singles CD cover formats. This version uses the original radio edit, while the UK video uses the UK mix of the song.

Internet meme
Beginning in late 2018, "Cry for You" received renewed interest when it appeared in a popular meme format on Twitter. The meme juxtaposes a portion of the song's chorus, in which Marklund sings "you'll never see me again", with captions that ascribe the statement to entities such as socks that go missing after doing laundry, "Tumblr users after December 17th" (in reference to the site's ban on pornography), or "Lady Gaga to pop music after the gays [let] ArtPop flop".

Sampling
In 2022, the song was sampled by British singer and songwriter Charli XCX on her song "Beg for You" (featuring Rina Sawayama) from her album Crash.

Track listings

Swedish CD single (CATCHY054)
"Cry for You" (Single Edit) (3:30)
"Cry for You" (Radio Extended) (5:25)
"Cry for You" (Jackal Remix Short) (4:00)
"Cry for You" (Jackal Remix Long) (5:48)

US CD single (72162)
"Cry for You" (Single Edit) (3:30)
"Cry for You" (Granite & Phunk Radio Edit) (3:33)
"Cry for You" (Jackal Remix Short) (4:00)
"Cry for You" (Radio Extended) (5:26)
"Cry for You" (Granite & Phunk Club Mix) (7:13)
"Cry for You" (Jackal Remix Long) (5:48)

Dutch Digital single
"Cry for You" (Radio Edit) (3:30)
"Cry for You" (Radio Extended) (5:25)
"Cry for You" (Jackal Remix Short) (4:00)
"Cry for You" (Jackal Remix Long) (5:48)
"Cry for You" (Jaydee Remix) (6:16)

Dutch CD single (SAR 200702)
"Cry for You" (Single Edit) (3:30)
"Cry for You" (Radio Extended) (5:25)
"Cry for You" (Jackal Remix Short) (4:00)
"Cry for You" (video)

UK Digital single
"Cry for You" (UK Radio Edit) (2:47)

UK CD single (H2B03CDX)
"Cry for You" (UK Radio Edit) (2:45)
"Cry for You" (Original Edit) (2:46)

UK CD maxi (H2B03CDS)
"Cry for You" (UK Radio Edit) (2:45)
"Cry for You" (Original Edit) (2:46)
"Cry for You" (Dave Ramone Extended Mix) (6:12)
"Cry for You" (Spencer & Hill Remix) (6:45)
"Cry for You" (Darren Styles Club Mix) (5:28)
"Cry for You" (Candlelight Edit) (3:06)
"Cry for You" (UK video)

UK Limited Promo 12" Vinyl (H2B03P2LTD)
"Cry for You" (Bad Behaviour Remix) (6:46)

Swedish CD single (CATCHY096) (Re-release)
"Cry for You" (UK Radio Edit) (2:45)
"Cry for You" (Original Edit) (2:46)
"Cry for You" (Dave Ramone Extended Mix) (6:12)
"Cry for You" (Spencer & Hill Remix) (6:45)
"Cry for You" (Darren Styles Club Mix) (5:28)
"Cry for You" (Candlelight Edit) (3:06)

US Digital single
"Cry for You" (Exclusive New Mix) (3:56)

Oceania Digital EP
"Cry for You" (Radio Edit) (3:29)
"Cry for You" (Extended) (5:25)
"Cry for You" (Spencer & Hill Remix) (6:45)
"Cry for You" (Darren Styles Club Mix) (5:28)
"Cry for You" (Dave Ramone Extended Mix) (6:12)
"Cry for You" (Jackal Remix) (5:49)
"Cry for You" (Candlelight Mix) (3:02)
"Satellites" (Acoustic Version) (3:03)

AUS/NZ CD single (CRSCD50553)
"Cry for You" (Radio Edit) (3:30)
"Cry for You" (Extended) (5:25)
"Cry for You" (Spencer & Hill Remix) (6:45)
"Cry for You" (Darren Styles Club Mix) (5:28)
"Cry for You" (Dave Ramone Extended Remix) (6:12)
"Cry for You" (Jackal Remix) (5:49)
"Cry for You" (Candlelight Edit) (3:02)

French Digital single
"Cry for You" (UK Radio Edit) (2:47)
"Cry for You" (Original Edit) (2:46)
"Cry for You" (Original Version) (3:30)
"Cry for You" (Acoustic Candlelight Edit) (3:06)
"Cry for You" (Dave Ramone Remix) (6:14)
"Cry for You" (Original Club Mix) (5:25)
"Cry for You" (Spencer Hill Remix) (6:17)
"Cry for You" (Spencer Hill Dub) (6:32)
"Cry for You" (Darren Styles Remix) (5:30)

French CD single (AS 192 999-7)
"Cry for You" (UK Radio Edit) (2:47)
"Cry for You" (Original Version) (3:28)
"Cry for You" (Original Club Mix) (5:25)
"Cry for You" (Dave Ramone Remix) (6:14)
"Cry for You" (Acoustic Candlelight Edit) (3:06)

German CD single (1782435)''
"Cry for You" (UK Radio Edit) (2:47)
"Cry for You" (Spencer & Hill Radio Edit) (6:45)
"Cry for You" (Dave Ramone Extended Mix) (6:14)
"Cry for You" (Acoustic Candlelight Edit) (3:06)

Charts

Weekly charts

Year-end charts

Certifications

Release history

References

External links
 Official website
 
 
 Single track listing at e.discogs

2006 singles
2006 songs
2008 singles
Petra Marklund songs
Songs about loneliness
Songs written by Anoo Bhagavan
Songs written by Jonas von der Burg
Songs written by Niklas von der Burg